August Willem Philip Weitzel (The Hague, 6 January 1816 –  29 March 1896) was a military officer who served as Dutch Minister of War for two cabinets, as well as Minister of Colonies in the interim Kabinet-Heemskerk Azn. cabinet.

Literature 
 "Merkwaardigheden uit mijn leven" was partially published under the title "Maar Majesteit!" in 1968

References

External links 
 Levensbericht van den Luitenant-Generaal A.W. Ph. Weitzel

1816 births
1896 deaths
Politicians from The Hague
Ministers of Colonial Affairs of the Netherlands
Military personnel from The Hague